Borlase is a surname and masculine given name.

A branch of the family De Taillefer, of Périgord, who were descended from the Count of Angoulême, came to England before the reign of Henry III (1207–1272). A king granted lands in the parish of St Wenn in Cornwall to Frank (French) Borlas Taillefer. Following the ancient Cornish tradition, the family adopted the name of their place of residence, Borlas, as their surname. Originally Borlase was a manor, but the name now exists as three farms: Borlase-Vath, Borlase Burgess and Borlase farm near Rosenannon.

A common saying in west Cornwall was ″Borlases were in Cornwall before the birth of Christ″.

People with the surname
 Charles Borlase (1820–1875), New Zealand politician, Mayor of Wellington
 Darryl Borlase, Australian footballer
 Deirdre Borlase (1925–2018), English painter and printmaker
 Edmund Borlase (1620–1682), Irish Protestant historian
 George Borlase (1743–1809), Knightbridge Professor of Philosophy at Cambridge
 Henry Borlase (c. 1590–c. 1624), English politician and Member of Parliament
 Jenny Borlase, three-time world champion netball player from Australia
 John Borlase (disambiguation)
 Nancy Borlase (1914–2006), New Zealand-born Australian painter and critic
 Peter Borlase (born 1985), New Zealand rugby player and coach
 William Borlase (disambiguation)

People with the given name
 Borlase Wyndham Childs (1876–1946), British Army major-general and Assistant Commissioner of Police of the Metropolis (London)
 Borlase Warren (1677–1747), English Member of Parliament
 Borlase Richmond Webb (c. 1696–1738), British landowner and Tory politician

See also
 Borlase baronets, a title in the Baronetage of England

References

English-language masculine given names